Matthew Scott Brown (born December 15, 1969) is an American college basketball coach and the current head men's basketball coach at the State Fair Community College. He was the former head coach at University of Missouri-Kansas City from 2007 to 2013.  Before becoming the head coach at UMKC, Brown was a member of John Beilein's staff for 10 years, five years at Richmond and five years at West Virginia. He was fired as head coach of UMKC on March 12, 2013, after posting a 64–122 record in six seasons.

From August 2015 to March 2016, Brown served as coach of the Northland Christian School. He was the head coach of Wentworth Military Academy in 2016–2017 while also serving as an adjunct professor of lifetime fitness. Brown was hired as head coach of State Fair Community College in April 2017.

Head coaching record

References

1969 births
Living people
American men's basketball coaches
American men's basketball players
College men's basketball head coaches in the United States
Northern Kentucky Norse men's basketball players
Place of birth missing (living people)
Richmond Spiders men's basketball coaches
Shippensburg Red Raiders men's basketball players
Kansas City Roos men's basketball coaches
West Virginia Mountaineers men's basketball coaches